The National Museum of Cambodia is Cambodia's largest museum of cultural history and is the country's leading historical and archaeological museum. It is located in Chey Chumneas, Phnom Penh.

Overview 

The museum houses one of the world's largest collections of Khmer art, including sculptural, Khmer ceramics, bronzes, and ethnographic objects. Its collection includes over 14,000 items, from prehistoric times to periods before, during and after the Khmer Empire, which at its height stretched from Thailand, across present-day Cambodia, to southern Vietnam.

The National Museum of Cambodia is located on Street 13 in central Phnom Penh, to the north of the Royal Palace and on the west side of Veal Preah Man square. The visitors' entrance to the compound is at the corner of Streets 13 and 178. The Royal University of Fine Arts is located on the west side of the museum. The museum is under the authority of the Cambodian Ministry of Culture and Fine Arts. The museum buildings, inspired by Khmer temple architecture, were constructed between 1917 and 1924, the museum was officially inaugurated in 1920, and it was renovated in 1968. The museum promotes awareness, understanding and appreciation of Cambodia's culture and heritage, aiming to educate and inspire its visitors.

History 

George Groslier (1887–1945), historian, curator and author was the motivating force behind much of the revival of interest in traditional Cambodian arts and crafts, and it was he who designed this  building that is today ‘traditional Khmer’ architecture. It is perhaps better described as a building enlarged from Cambodian temple prototypes seen on ancient bas-reliefs and reinterpreted through colonial eyes to meet the museum-size requirements.

The foundation stone for the new museum was laid on 15 August 1917. Some two-and-a-half years later, the completed museum was inaugurated during Khmer New Year on 13 April 1920 in the presence of H.M King Sisowath, François-Marius Baudouin, Résident-supérieur, and M. Groslier, director of Cambodian Arts, and Conservator of the museum.

The original design of the building was slightly altered in 1924 with extensions that added wings at either end of the eastern façade that made the building even more imposing.

Control of the National Museum and Arts Administration was ceded by the French to the Cambodians on 9 August 1951 and following Independence in 1953, the then Musée National de Phnom Penh was the subject of bilateral accords. In 1966 Chea Thay Seng was the first Cambodian director of the museum and dean of the newly created Department of Archaeology at the Royal University of Fine Arts. This university that form its foundation as the Ecole des Arts Cambodgiens in 1920 was intimately linked with students, artisans and teachers who worked to preserve Cambodian cultural traditions, can still be found to the rear of the museum.

During the Khmer Rouge regime (from 1975 to 1979), all aspects of Cambodian life including the cultural realm were devastated. The museum, along with the rest of Phnom Penh, was evacuated and abandoned. The museum, closed between 1975 and 1979, and was found in disrepair, its roof rotten and home to a vast colony of bats, the garden overgrown, and the collection in disarray, many objects damaged or stolen. The museum was quickly tidied up and reopened to the public on 13 April 1979. However, many of the museum's employees had lost their lives during the Khmer Rouge regime.

Collections

Together with the adjacent Royal University of Fine Arts and its Department of Archaeology, the National Museum of Cambodia works to enhance knowledge of and preserve Cambodian cultural traditions and to provide a source of pride and identity to the Cambodian people. The museum also serves a religious function; its collection of important Buddhist and Hindu sculpture addresses community religious needs as a place of worship. A permanent exhibition, Post-Angkorian Buddha, supported by UNESCO and a number of individuals and local businesses, opened in 2000 to extend the religious function of the museum.

Under the auspices of the Cambodian Department of Museums, the museum not only manages its own collection, staff, and premises but also supports and oversees all other state-run museums in Cambodia. Its activities are further supported by private individuals, foreign governments, and numerous philanthropic organizations. The activities of the museum include the presentation, conservation, safekeeping, interpretation, and acquisition of Cambodian cultural material, as well as the repatriation of Cambodian cultural property. Looting and illicit export of Cambodian cultural material are a continuing concern.

Outside of Cambodia, the museum promotes the understanding of Cambodian arts and culture by lending objects from its collection for major international exhibitions. This practice was in place before Cambodia's recent decades of unrest and was reinstituted in the 1990s, starting with an exhibition held at the National Gallery of Australia in 1992. Subsequent exhibitions have been held in France, the United States, Japan, South Korea, and Germany.

Gallery

See also
 Tuol Sleng Genocide Museum.

Literature
Jessup, Helen Ibbitson, et al. (2006). Masterpieces of the National Museum of Cambodia.  Norfolk, CT: Friends of Khmer Culture. 112 pages.  , 
Khun, Samen (4th ed., revised 2013).  The New Guide to the National Museum—Phnom Penh.  Phnom Penh, Cambodia: Ariyathoar. 203 pages.  (for availability, email: museum_cam@camnet.com.kh)

Sources

Adapted, with permission, from National Museum of Cambodia

External links
Cambodia Travel Guide

 National Museum of Cambodia homepage
Article: Cambodian National Museum Marks 90th Anniversary
Article: Treasures of Khmer Culture — The National Museum of Cambodia
  Cambodia Cultural Profile (Ministry of Culture and Fine Arts/Visiting Arts)

Cambodia
Museums in Phnom Penh
Museums established in 1917
Archaeological museums in Cambodia
Asian art museums